Mitre Square is a small square in the City of London.

History
The square occupies the site of the cloister of Holy Trinity Priory, Aldgate which was demolished under Henry VIII at the time of the Dissolution of the Monasteries. The south corner of the square was the site of the murder of Catherine Eddowes by Jack the Ripper. Her mutilated body was found there at 1:44 in the morning on 30 September 1888. This was the westernmost of the Whitechapel murders and the only one located within the City.

Eddowes' murder on the site of the old monastery is ascribed to an ancient curse in a contemporary penny dreadful entitled The Curse Upon Mitre Square A.D. 1530–1888 by J.F. Brewer.

One Mitre Square
A 19-storey, 79m-high office development is proposed for the square, known as One Mitre Square.

Image gallery

References

Jack the Ripper
Squares in the City of London